Italy has participated in all editions of the FIS Alpine World Ski Championships, held since the first edition of FIS Alpine World Ski Championships 1931, winning 73 podiums, including 22 world titles, 25 silver medals and 26 bronze medals.

History
The Italian team participated for the first time in the Alpine World Ski Championships already starting from the first edition, however with a single athlete, Carlo Barassi, who finished 20th in slalom, 25th in downhill and 16th in combined. The first medal of ever was a gold medal won by a women, Paula Wiesinger in Cortina 1932.

Following the WWII, the championships were connected with the Olympics for several decades. From 1948 through 1982, the competition was held in even-numbered years, with the Winter Olympics acting as the World Championships through 1980, and a separate competition held in even-numbered non-Olympic years.

Medal count

Skiers appearances

Men 1931-1970

Men 1972-2021

Women 1931-1970

Women 1972-2021

See also
Italy national alpine ski team
Italian Winter Sports Federation

References

External links
 Italian Winter Sports Federation 
 Italy World Ski Chanpionships Medals at Ski Database